Guido De Murtas (Bologna, 5 February 1936) is a retired Italian sprinter.

Biography
He won one gold medal at the Summer Universiade, he has 6 caps in national team from 1958 to 1960.

See also
 Italy national relay team

References

External links
  Olimpionici Bolognesi

1936 births
Living people
Italian male sprinters
Sportspeople from Bologna
Universiade medalists in athletics (track and field)
Universiade gold medalists for Italy
Medalists at the 1959 Summer Universiade